The Bel Air Fire was a disaster that began as a brush fire on November 6, 1961, in the Bel Air community of Los Angeles. The fire destroyed 484 homes and burned  At least 200 Firemen were injured, with mostly eye injuries due to the smoke and flying embers.  The fire was fueled by strong Santa Ana winds.

There were multiple celebrities affected by the fire. Actors Dennis Hopper and Brooke Hayward, Burt Lancaster, Joan Fontaine, and Zsa Zsa Gabor, comedian Joe E. Brown, Nobel laureate chemist Willard Libby, composers Lukas Foss and Conrad Salinger, and writer Aldous Huxley all lost homes in the fire. Others that fought flames before they evacuated were former Vice President Richard Nixon, actor Robert Taylor, film producer Keith Daniels and orchestra leader Billy Vaughn.

The fire's precise cause was not determined, but it was believed to be accidental.

Aftermath
As a result of the Bel Air Fire, Los Angeles initiated a series of laws and fire safety policies.  These included the banning of wood shingle roofs in new construction and one of the most stringent brush clearance policies in the US.

The Los Angeles City Fire Department produced a documentary, "Design For Disaster", about the wildfire, narrated by William Conrad. It called the densely packed homes nestled on hillsides covered in dry brush "a serious problem in fire protection, even under the best of conditions."

References

Wildfires in Los Angeles County, California
1961 fires in the United States
1961 in California
1960s wildfires in the United States
Bel Air, Los Angeles
Brentwood, Los Angeles
Santa Monica Mountains
1961 natural disasters in the United States
1961 in Los Angeles
November 1961 events in the United States